Zoe McKenzie (born 2 October 1972) is an Australian politician who is a member of the Liberal Party and has served in the House of Representatives since May 2022, representing the Division of Flinders in Victoria.

Biography
McKenzie served on the board of the Committee for Mornington Peninsula. She was a member of the Spider Crabs Alliance and has worked with Australia's Free Trade Agreement network. McKenzie has also practiced as a lawyer.

McKenzie was elected to the House of Representatives at the 2022 federal election, standing in the Division of Flinders.

References 

Living people
Women members of the Australian House of Representatives
Liberal Party of Australia members of the Parliament of Australia
Members of the Australian House of Representatives
Members of the Australian House of Representatives for Flinders
21st-century Australian women politicians
1972 births